David Jaomanoro (December 30, 1953 – December 7, 2014) was a Malagasy writer, playwright and poet.

Personal life 
Jaomanoro wrote poems until he attended university. He was a teacher in Antsiranana for ten years and then studied at the University of Antananarivo. He received a Master's Degree in Comparative Traditional Malagasy Literature from the University of Limoges in France. In 1988, he started teaching French in Antsiranana.

His works have been translated into English and Dutch.

Death 
Jaomanoro died on December 7, 2014, in Mayotte at the age of 60.

Works

Novels 

 1987 – Quatram's j'aime ça
 1988 - Le dernier caïman

Novellas 

 1992 – Funérailles d'un cochon et 13 autres novelles, Éditions Sepia

Essays 

 2011 – Publics d’alphabétisation à Mayotte, Éditions universitaires européennes

Theatre 

 1988 – J'ai marché dessus Radio France Internationale, édition ronéotypé12
 1990 – La Retraite, éditions Promotion Théâtre
 1991 – Docteur parvenu, Les Carnets de l'exotisme2
 1997 – Joambilo, Revue Noire2
 2006 – Pirogue sur le vide et autres nouvelles, Éditions de l’Aube
 2013 – Le Mangeur de cactus (récit) Éditions L’Harmattan

References 

1953 births
2014 deaths
University of Antananarivo alumni
University of Limoges alumni
French-language writers from Madagascar